John Joseph Devlin (6 January 1900 – 26 May 1957) was an Australian politician. Born at Violet Town, Victoria, he was educated at state schools before becoming a farmer. He served on Violet Town Shire Council from 1927 to 1957, and as President for some of that time. In 1946, he was elected to the Australian Senate as a Labor Senator for Victoria. He died in 1957; Charles Sandford was appointed to replace him.

References

Australian Labor Party members of the Parliament of Australia
Members of the Australian Senate for Victoria
Members of the Australian Senate
1900 births
1957 deaths
20th-century Australian politicians